Bastianini is an Italian surname. Notable people with the surname include:

Enea Bastianini (born 1997), Italian Grand Prix motorcycle racer
Ettore Bastianini (1922–1967), Italian opera singer
Giovanni Bastianini (1830–1868), Italian sculptor
Giuseppe Bastianini (1899–1961), Italian politician and diplomat
Guido Bastianini (born 1945), Italian papyrologist and palaeographer
Pablo Bastianini (born 1982), Argentine footballer

Italian-language surnames